is a Japanese football player.

Playing career
Ikehata was born in Hamamatsu on June 7, 1979. After graduating from Shimizu Commercial High School, he joined the J1 League club Sanfrecce Hiroshima in 1998. Although he debuted as center back in first season, he did not play much. In 1999, he moved to Verdy Kawasaki. However he did not play much there either. In 2001, he moved to the J2 League club Oita Trinita. He became a regular center back in mid-2001. In 2002, he moved to the J2 club Ventforet Kofu. He played as regular center back for a long time and the club was promoted to J1 in 2006. However he lost his regular position in 2006. Although he became a regular player again in late 2007, the club was relegated to J2 in 2008. In 2010, he did not play at all. In 2011, he moved to Kataller Toyama. Although he played in many matches at first, his playing time gradually decreased in 2014 and the club was relegated to the J3 League in 2015. In 2016, he moved to the Prefectural Leagues club Okinawa SV. The club was promoted to the Regional Leagues in 2018. He left the club at the end of the 2018 season.

Club statistics

References

External links

1979 births
Living people
Association football people from Shizuoka Prefecture
Japanese footballers
J1 League players
J2 League players
J3 League players
Sanfrecce Hiroshima players
Tokyo Verdy players
Oita Trinita players
Ventforet Kofu players
Kataller Toyama players
Association football defenders